Angelo My Love is a 1983 American drama film directed by Robert Duvall and starring Angelo Evans. The screenplay is about New York City Romani people. It was screened out of competition at the 1983 Cannes Film Festival.

Cast
 Angelo Evans as himself
 Michael Evans as himself
 Ruthie Evans as herself
 Tony Evans as himself
 Debbie Evans as herself
 Steve Tsigonoff as himself
 Millie Tsigonoff as herself
 Frankie Williams as himself
 George Nicholas as himself
 Katerina Ribraka as Patricia
 Timothy Phillips as School Teacher
 Lachlan Youngs as Student Reporter
 Jennifer Youngs as Student Reader

Production
Robert Duvall first saw the lead actor, Angelo, in 1977 when he was 8 years old, having an argument with an older woman on Columbus Avenue that "sounded like a lovers quarrel." The screenplay for Angelo My Love was written by Mr. Duvall, with some dialogue improvised by the Romani actors, most of whom play themselves.

Besides Angelo are his older brother Michael, his fortune teller mother, his sister Debbie, and his girlfriend Patricia (Katerina Ribraka); his father Tony Evans, from the movie might have been thought to be absent, but is actually in a couple of scenes.

Reception
"Angelo is a kind of idealized sum-total of all New York street kids no matter what their ethnic backgrounds. He is physically small but he has such a big, sharply defined personality that he seems to be a child possessed by the mind and experiences of a con man in his 20s. Then, as the movie goes on, one sees Angelo moving from glib, smart-talking self-assurance to childhood tears and back again, all in the space of a few seconds of screen time. This, too, may be part of Angelo's con, but it's also unexpectedly moving as well as funny. Angelo, among other things, is scared of ghosts."

Variety reported that Mr. Duvall spent five years and more than $1 million on the film and that many of the cast, including Angelo, did not read English.

San Francisco, New York, and Los Angeles commercial screenings were documented, with a Cinemax cable presentation in 1985.

See also
Mishka Ziganoff

References

External links
 
 
 The Making of "Angelo My Love"'' by Lorimar Motion Pictures

1983 films
1983 drama films
1983 independent films
1980s coming-of-age drama films
American coming-of-age drama films
1980s English-language films
Films directed by Robert Duvall
Films about Romani people
Films set in New York City
Films shot in New York City
American independent films
Romani in the United States
Romani-language films
1980s American films